Panauti is a municipality in Kavrepalanchok District in Bagmati Province of Nepal located 32 km Southeast of the capital Kathmandu.  The town is currently listed as a UNESCO tentative site since 1996.

Origin
Panauti is a historical city in Nepal, originally it was a small state given by King Bhupatindra Malla as a dowry to his sister. This town has a population of under 15,000 people and a few prominent icons, such as the Indreswor temple and Panauti (Layaku) Durbar square found in the town center. At the end of the 13th century, Panauti was finally integrated into the unified kingdom of Nepal, along with Kathmandu, Patan, and Bhaktapur, which are all former capital cities of the Kathmandu valley. Panauti was a trading hub along the ancient Salt Trade route between Tibet and India. Actually, the recorded history of Panauti goes back to the first century AD. However, with the end of the Salt trade in the 1950s and the construction of the Arniko Highway in the 1960s bypassing this old town, Panauti has gone into an economic rut. Panauti, consists of a variety of Buddhist and Hindu religious monuments, and is considered to be one of the area's most important medieval sites. Panauti is also steeped in culture and tradition. Visitors will often find colorful stones, petals and other items that are laid out on the pavement to welcome everyone with great hospitality.

Panauti, situated at the confluence of the two rivers Rosi and Punyamati, has been regarded as an important religious site since very early times. In Nepali society, such rivers are considered to be sacred. A visit or just an ablution to such places enables the visitor to be freed from many sins and anxieties, as it is believed to be sacred. Moreover, it is also believed that at Panauti, in addition to aforesaid two rivers, a third river Lilawati also converges making it again a tri-junction called Triveni. However, the last one is said to be visible only to the sheers and the intellectuals. The presence of this at Panauti has added and remarkably enhanced its religious sanctity and popularity as well. On account of this, every festive occasion, a great number of devotees from all across the country pour here for a holy ablution and to pay homage to the nearby Indreshwor Mahadev Temple and other holy sites located here. The site is also regarded as Prayagtirtha of Nepal.

Historical

Panauti is one of the oldest towns in Nepal, consisting of many temples that are still present till this day dating back to the 15th century or earlier. It has been debated that Panauti was founded by Ananda Malla (1274-1310AD), others believe that there is a golden scripture dated 1385, which is located within the Indreshwar temple stating that King Harisingh Dev founded the town.

The Indreshwar temple is one of the largest and tallest pagoda style temples in Nepal. It was originally built over a lingam in 1294, making it the oldest surviving temple of Nepal. The roof struts embellishing the two lower stories of the temple are distinct Nepalese wood-carving and architecture. The upper section of the temple is hung with pots and pans, offerings from young married couples hoping for a happy and prosperous family life. The temple is in good condition and survived the 2015 earthquake. It is from this temple that the mystical third river of Panauti starts from leading to the Brahmayani temple across from the Tri Beni Ghats.

The Indreshwar temple is kept in a very well maintained, walled in, compound which is managed by the Panauti Museum.

Other than this temple, there is also the king's palace in Panauti's Durbar Square, which has yet to be excavated to a larger extent in order to reveal more about Panauti. Nevertheless, there are many artifacts and remnants such as stone taps, bricks, water wells and coins found among some of the excavated sections of the palace.

Although Panauti was founded independently, as time went on the influence of Bhaktapur (an ancient Newar town in the east corner from Kathmandu) increased and later became part of Bhaktapur up until the 18th century. In 1763, King Prithvi Narayan Shah annexed Panauti to the larger and greater Nepal.

Cultural distinctions
Panauti, consists of a variety of Buddhist and Hindu religious monuments, and is considered to be one of the area's most important medieval sites. It is also considered as the most artistic town in Nepal after Kathmandu Valley.

As every culture has its unique ceremonies and celebration, Panauti holds a number of festivals reflecting the ancient tradition and ancient mythology. One of the most important is the three-day-long Panauti Jatra.

Panauti Jatra
Panauti Jatra is known as the chariot festival which takes place every year in Panauti, at the end of the monsoon. The Jatra festival usually begins on the tenth day of the bright fortnight during the month of Jestha (May–June). The Jatra is usually celebrated for three days, as everyone becomes busy for the preparation of celebrating the festival, known as "Duin-chha-nya-ye-ke-guis", which is usually held in the evening. This event is one of the major cultural attractions of the Panauti Jatra. During this festival, images of the gods (from the town's temples) are placed in a chariot and displayed around the city. The pulling of the chariot begins from the town's old Durbar Square. A team consisting of a priest, a woman, and a porter crosses the bridge over the Punyamati River to worship the Gods. This crossing over the Punyamati River is a yearly event and signifies the tradition from many years before. The following day of festival is called Mu-jatra, which means the main festival. On this day, many of the residents of Panauti will sacrifice male goats or ducks to the Gods, and many other will simply make an offering of food. The sixth day is the full moon day, which is also known as Panauti Punhi. This day is the most favorable day for visiting the river and cleaning your body.

Makar Mela
Panauti is situated at the confluence of two main rivers, Rosi and Punyamati which has been regarded as an important religious site. In Nepali society, it is also believed that rivers are sacred places and such a visit allows man to cleanse his body and be freed from sins and anxieties. Furthermore, it is believed that there is also a third “invisible” river, Lilawati creating a tri-junction and is historically known to have remarkably enhanced Nepal's religious sanctity and popularity especially in Panuati. Due to the convergence of these three rivers, on festive occasions, large numbers of people from around the world come to this holy place to pay their respects, as well as visiting the Indreswor temple and other holy sites located in Panuati. The confluence of these three rivers is an important pilgrimage site where every 12 years, a month-long fair is held known as the Makar Mela. During this celebration, hundred and thousands of devotees visit Panauti to cleanse themselves in this sacred water.

This festival is running in Harisiddhi VDC Since 774 Nepal Sambat by King Pratap Malla.

The Harisiddhi dance is considered to be the oldest traditional dance in Nepal.This dance was initiated about 2,400 years ago by King Vikramaditya. It is said to use the language of gods and speech of the spirits. As a result of discontinuity, it disappeared and King Amar Malla was the first to re-initiate the dance. However, the tradition again vanished and was finally revived by King Pratap Malla.

The Raja (Vikramajit) went back to Ujjain, and having brought the god of three Shakties, of attributes, named Harisiddhi, placed her near Nil Tara from this, the village of Harisiddhi took its origin. The Raja then under the direction of the Goddess brought all the gods Nepal to that place with great ceremonies and dramatic and vocal instrumental music. It is well known that there is no dramatic performances to that of Harisiddhi.

So, this time after 60 years of history. It is coming to Panauti again to Mark the Makar Mela 2066. Hope we will be able to Welcome them with Heart fully & Warmly in our Historical town Panauti.

Education
Public Colleges:

 Indreshwor Campus, Panauti-7
 Tej Ganga Multiple Campus, Panauti-8
 Kusadevi Campus, Panauti-2

Private Colleges

 Siddhartha Vanasthali Institute, Panauti-3
 Malpi Institute

Economic condition
During the 1990s, a program of corporation of French Food, funded and enabled the complete renovation of a number of religious monuments and historical buildings within Panauti. This cleansing of the old town through a vast number of networks, allowed to initiate the creation of many new schools.

Nepal's rural to urban migration has been vastly accelerating, with population grow rates in urban areas as high as 7%, which is well over the national population growth rate of 2.3% per annum.
Some of Nepal's urban areas now experience inadequate drinking water supply, haphazard disposal of solid waste and human waste, and uncontrolled urban development.

Information Technology Park, Nepal is located in Panauti.

Recently, the Nepal Urban and Environmental Improvement Project has been set up by the government in order to attend to this decentralization situation. The project has five main components:
 Municipal institutional strengthening and revenue mobilization
 Provision of urban and environmental infrastructure
 Provision of supplementary urban facilities
 Community development
 Project implementation assistance.

This project was recently approved in December 2002 and is expected to be completed by the year 2009.

The introduction of urban and rural tourism development in Panauti has enhanced the socio-economic standards within the region. Tourism is a major source of economic, socio-cultural and environmental effect as it reduces the level of poverty within the city. Studies have shown that the local people will benefit from tourism in the region, as well as establishing a new unique tourist destination, while at the same time protecting natural and cultural heritage.

Since tourism has such a large role in the development of Panauti, some of the distinct types are the following:
 Nature-based/Eco-tourism: picnic spots development, establishment of cultural heritage museum, Eco-Circuit Trail and Eco-trek Development.
 Pilgrimage tourism: Improvement of temple site in the study area; improvement and development of pilgrimage tourism facilities; repair and maintenance of religious sites.
 Village tourism: development of individual and community home-stay, community lodge, resort development, traditional cultural instruments, establishment of rural market center.
 Health tourism: Establishment of old people's home, development of resort facilities for therapists, health tourism promotional activities, training to health assistance ad nurses.
 Adventure tourism: bungy jumping, rock climbing, hiking, trekking, biking.
 Research and survey of Panauti: Archaeology and cultural survey.

Other programs include, the development of recreational trails, development of settlements, improved foot trails, development of drinking water and irrigation facilities, establishing an international school of tourism and training local youths regarding cultural heritage.

This project that has been implemented can definitely benefit the less privileged people within the community as it allows them to become more aware of and involved in the development of their residential area. This project also closely worked with the communities, allowing them to feel a part of the project, as they played a key role in the project implementation. For instance, the community helped in designing the water supply system for the city. Furthermore, this project has enhanced the sewerage component, which is the fundamental building block for these people, who are forced to live in the most unhygienic conditions.

Media 
To promote local culture, Panauti has one FM radio station Radio Prime FM, 104.5 MHz, which is a community radio station.

Gallery

References

External links
Himalayan Park in Nepal

Populated places in Kavrepalanchok District
Municipalities in Bagmati Province
Nepal municipalities established in 1997